The Zadar Open is a professional tennis tournament played on outdoor clay courts. It is currently part of the ATP Challenger Tour. It is held in Zadar, Croatia since 2021.

Past finals

Singles

Doubles

References

ATP Challenger Tour
Clay court tennis tournaments
Tennis tournaments in Croatia
Zadar
2021 establishments in Croatia
Recurring sporting events established in 2021